Benjamin Szold (15 November 1829 in Nemes-Kürt Kingdom of Hungary, (now Zemianske Sady, Slovakia), – 31 July 1902 in Berkeley Springs, West Virginia) was an American rabbi and scholar.

Szold studied under Rabbis Jacob Fischer of Shalgaw, Wolf Kollin of Vrbové, and Benjamin Wolf Löw at the Pressburg Yeshiva, and received the rabbinical authorization from Judah Assod of Bur and Simon Sidon of Tyrnau. In 1848, he studied in Vienna, but when the revolution of that year broke out he went to Pressburg. From 1849 to 1855 he tutored in private families in Hungary, and in the latter year entered the Jewish Theological Seminary of Breslau and the University of Breslau, where he remained until 1858. While a student he officiated during the holy days at Brieg, Silesia (1857), and at Stockholm, Sweden (1858). In 1859, he accepted a call from the Temple Oheb Shalom (Baltimore, Maryland) in whose service he remained until his death, first as rabbi and later (after 1892) as rabbi emeritus. He arrived in the United States on September 21, 1859, about a month after his marriage to Sophie Schaar, and immediately took active charge of the congregation. Under his guidance it grew rapidly, and, actuated by his example, it became widely known for its strict observance of Shabbat. Before Szold's arrival the congregation had adopted for use in its Shabbat service the Minhag America (which was the new prayer-book written by Isaac Mayer Wise, a Reform rabbi); on the great fall holy days it reverted to the Minhag Ashkenaz; after much discussion with his congregation Szold introduced a new prayer-book, Abodat Yisrael, which closely followed traditional lines. The first edition of this prayer-book appeared in 1863, with German translation, and was widely adopted by congregations in the United States; new editions were published in 1864 and 1865 (the latter with English translation), and another, revised edition in 1871, Rabbis Marcus Jastrow of Philadelphia and Henry Hochheimer of Baltimore being associated with Szold in its publication.

During his entire career Szold opposed radicalism, and fought the extreme tendencies that had already manifested themselves when he went to the United States. He took a prominent part in communal life, and besides aiding in establishing the charitable institutions of Baltimore, he devoted himself to helping Russian refugees who had emigrated to America on account of the iniquitous May Laws. He was in sympathy with the nationalist (later Zionist) movement, speaking in its favor as early as the winter of 1893–94 before the Zion Society of Baltimore. As an exegete he developed a subtle and original system in which full account was taken of the work of the Masorites. His "Commentary on Job" (Baltimore, 1886), written in classical Hebrew and conceived in an original and deeply Jewish spirit, attests to the accuracy of his scholarship. His publications include articles in Jewish and in secular periodicals, as well as sermons, lectures, religious school-books, and devotional literature. He wrote also a commentary on the eleventh chapter of Daniel (Kohut Memorial Volume), edited "Bibelkritische Notizen" by Michael Heilprin, and published a sketch of Moses Mendelssohn on the occasion of the 150th anniversary of his birth. He left numerous manuscripts.

His daughter Henrietta was a translator, editor, philanthropist, educator, Zionist leader and the founder of Hadassah. Her younger sister Adele Szold-Seltzer (1876-1940) was the translator of the first American edition of Maya the Bee. It was published in 1922 by her husband Thomas Seltzer.

See also
 Henrietta Szold
 Robert Szold (Cousin of Henrietta Szold)
 Zip Szold (Wife of Robert Szold)

References

External sources 
 Goldman, Yosef. Hebrew Printing in America, 1735–1926, A History and Annotated Bibliography (YGBooks 2006).
 "Benjamin_Szold" Jewish Encyclopedia
 [Wilhelm, Kurt]. Benjamin Szold and the Rabbinical Post in Stockholm in 1858. With An Unpublished Letter of Isaac M. Wise. In: Historia Iudaica, N.Y., 1953, 1, pp. 49–58

American people of Hungarian-Jewish descent
American Reform rabbis
Austro-Hungarian rabbis
Hungarian rabbis
People from Galanta District
People from the Kingdom of Hungary
Religious leaders from Baltimore
1829 births
1902 deaths
Hungarian emigrants to the United States
19th-century American rabbis